Ayu Rosmalina (born 20 June 1992), better known by her stage name Ayu Ting Ting (also spelled Ayu Tingting) is an Indonesian dangdut singer who rose to fame in 2011 for her song "Alamat Palsu" ("Fake Address") that was released in 2006. Her stage name "Ting Ting" means "virgin".

Biography
Ayu was born in Depok, West Java on 20 June 1990 to a civil servant and his wife. She began modelling at the age of 5, and was introduced to dangdut around that time. Ayu began her music career as a wedding singer at the age of 14, earning Rp. 250,000 (US$28) per performance; that year she was also Miss Depok. In 2007 she recorded a solo album, Dilanjut Aja (Just Continue), with Akurama Records which included "Alamat Palsu" ("Fake Address") (written by a man from Tasikmalaya) and "Ting Ting". "Ting Ting" used the title as a euphemism for 'virgin', including lyrics such as "saya masih ting-ting / dan terjamin ting-ting" ("I'm still ting-ting / and guaranteed to be ting-ting"); she later added ting ting to her first name to create a stage name, at the suggestion of her producers.

In 2010, Ayu enrolled at Gunadharma University, taking a bachelor's degree in management .

In 2011, five years after its release(2006), "Alamat Palsu" became popular, with covers by comedian Sule and singer Olga Syahputra. After her rise to popularity, helped in part by Syahputra, Ayu can earn Rp. 30 million for six songs.

Style
Ayu has stated that she attempts to emphasize her voice when singing and not sell her body, something she considers common in dangdut culture; she does not use sensual movements when dancing like some of her peers. She instead attempts to be herself, although with some Korean fashion influence; her attempts to be herself have been applauded by fellow dangdut singer Julia Perez. She has been described as a tomboy, and has stated that before rising to stardom she rarely bothered with makeup.

Personal life
Ayu currently lives in Depok, West Java. She is said to be uncomfortable with the sawer culture common in dangdut, where men slip the singer (commonly females) money to dance onstage with her; she has stated that she was once approached, given money, and kissed on both hands while performing, after which she stopped the show.

Ayu is a fan of K-pop, although she also likes the dangdut of Dewi Persik; she has stated that Persik's "goyang gergaji" ("saw move") requires skill and confidence that she herself does not possess.

Ayu married Henry Baskoro Hendarso (née Enji) on February 4, 2013,. On December 31, 2013, she gave birth to a baby girl named Bilqis Khumairah Razak in Jakarta. On January 27, 2014, Ayu filed for divorce at the Depok Religious Court. On April 1, 2014, the court agreed to her request for divorce by verstek (without her spouse present), valid two weeks after its decision if it was not challenged by Enji.

In 2015, Ayu was in a relationship with Indian actor Shaheer Sheikh. The relationship lasted for four months before they broke up.

In September 2017, Ayu Ting Ting was invited to KBS Music Bank. Due to her persona as a K-Pop fan, she could perform K-Pop songs successfully.

Discography
Geol Ajep-Ajep (2006)
Best of Ayu Ting Ting (2015)

References

Bibliography

External links
 

1992 births
Living people
Betawi people
Indonesian Muslims
People from Depok
21st-century Indonesian women singers
Indonesian dangdut singers
Indonesian pop singers
Indonesian film actresses
Indonesian television actresses
Actresses from West Java
Musicians from West Java
Anugerah Musik Indonesia winners
Indonesian game show hosts